Asaf Duraković (16 May 1940 – 16 December 2020) was a Croatian medical doctor. He is also known for his poetry and verses.

Duraković was born in Stolac, Bosnia and Herzegovina and educated at the University of Zagreb in Zagreb, Croatia where he earned both master's and doctoral degrees.  During this time he worked at the Ruđer Bošković Institute.  Afterwards he continued with post-doctoral work at Oxford University. In 1968 he migrated to Canada, where he attended McMaster University in Hamilton. He worked at the University of Toronto, the University of Washington, and University of Rochester (UofR). He has been associated with the Croatian Literary Journal. Duraković is one of the co-founders of the Croatian Islamic Centre in Etobicoke, Toronto, the construction of which was finished on June 23, 1973. Its mosque is the oldest in Toronto. The minaret is Ottoman-style and it is the oldest minaret in Ontario.

In 1990, Duraković was one of the founders of the Croatian Muslim Democratic Party, formed in Zagreb.

Dr. Duraković is a retired Colonel in the US Army Reserve. He worked at the VA hospital in Wilmington, Delaware.

Dr. Duraković also founded the World Life Institute, an international non-profit humanitarian organization based in Orleans County, New York. In addition, other World Life organizations inspired by Dr. Duraković have been established worldwide. World Life organizations can be found in Canada, Croatia and Denmark, Great Britain and South Africa.

Works

Poetry 
Dark Sea-Weeds
Smoke and Mist
Paths of Ahasver

Politics 
From Bleiburg to Muslim Nation (Vedrina, Toronto, 1972)
Status of Moslim People in Croatian National Community (Vedrina, Toronto, 1973)

See also
Uranium Medical Research Centre

References

1940 births
2020 deaths
Croatian physicians
Croatian poets
Croatian male poets
Croatian Muslims
People from Stolac
Croatian nuclear medicine physicians
Yugoslav expatriates in England
Yugoslav military doctors
University of Washington faculty
University of Rochester faculty
Yugoslav expatriates in Canada
Yugoslav expatriates in the United States